Lord of the River may refer to the following East Asian river gods:

Hebo, god of the Yellow River in Chinese mythology
Habaek, Goguryeo god of the Amnok River
Kawa-no-kami, river god in Japanese mythology